Perimeter Highway is a beltway encircling Winnipeg, Manitoba, Canada.

Perimeter Highway may also refer to:

The Perimeter, Interstate 285 in Atlanta, Georgia
Outer Perimeter, a proposed outer beltway in Atlanta, Georgia